Rannoch railway station, on the West Highland Line, serves the area of Rannoch in Perth and Kinross, Scotland. In 2017, Simon Jenkins reported it to be one of the best 10 stations in Britain. It is situated between Corrour and Bridge of Orchy,  from Craigendoran Junction, near Helensburgh. ScotRail manage the station and operate most services, along with Caledonian Sleeper.

History 

When the West Highland Line was built across Rannoch Moor, its builders had to float the tracks on a mattress of tree roots, brushwood and thousands of tons of earth and ashes to prevent the heavy steel tracks sinking in the bog.

Rannoch station opened to passengers on 7 August 1894.

The station was laid out with a crossing loop and an island platform. There were sidings on both sides, and a turntable on the east side of the line. The siding on the east side has been removed. The station was host to a LNER camping coach from 1937 to 1939.

On 25 January 1987, the crossing loop was altered to right-hand running. The original Down platform has thus become the Up platform, and vice versa. The change was made in order to simplify shunting at this station, by removing the need to hand-pump the train-operated loop points to access the sidings.

At the north end of the platform is a sculptured head, carved in stone by the navvies (workmen) who built the line. It commemorates James Renton, a director of the West Highland Railway, who gave part of his personal fortune to save the line from bankruptcy during construction when the brushwood raft was continually sinking into Rannoch Moor.

Signalling 

The signal box, which had 17 levers, was situated on the island platform. From the time of its opening in 1894, the West Highland Railway was worked throughout by the electric token system.

In August 1985, the method of working between Crianlarich and Rannoch reverted to the electric token block system. The semaphore signals were removed on 3 November 1985 in preparation for the introduction of Radio Electronic Token Block (RETB).

This resulted in the closure of Rannoch signal box and others on that part of the line. The RETB is controlled from a Signalling Centre at Banavie railway station.

The Train Protection & Warning System was installed in 2003.

There was formerly another crossing point on Rannoch Moor, at Gorton near where the railway crossed the Rannoch Drove Road, and operationally dividing the long section between Bridge of Orchy and Rannoch stations. It remains today as an engineer's siding but devoid of the original buildings.

Location 
Although the railway links the station with Glasgow and Fort William on the West Highland Line, the station area is otherwise more closely linked, by road, with central Highland towns and villages on or near the A9 road. Its remote location on Rannoch Moor is picturesque and makes it attractive to walkers.

Facilities 
The station is well equipped despite its rural location, with a café and visitor centre, toilets, a phone and a car park and bike racks. However, the only access is via a stepped footbridge, so the station does not have step-free access. As there are no facilities to purchase tickets, passengers must buy one in advance, or from the guard on the train.

Passenger volume 

The statistics cover twelve month periods that start in April.

Services 

Monday to Saturday, ScotRail operates three services north to Mallaig and three services south to Glasgow Queen Street. On Sundays, this decreases to just two each way. Caledonian Sleeper run six services per week (not Saturday nights) each way to Fort William, and London Euston via Edinburgh. The sleeper also carries seated coaches and can therefore be used by regular passengers to/from stations towards Edinburgh, as it is booked to pick up/set down at some stations.

See also
Rannoch Barracks
Loch Rannoch
Rannoch School
Kinloch Rannoch
Dunalastair
Tummel hydro-electric power scheme
The Soldiers' Trenches, Moor of Rannoch

References

Bibliography

External links 

Video footage of Rannoch railway station
Video footage of Rannoch Station School

Railway stations in Perth and Kinross
Former North British Railway stations
Railway stations in Great Britain opened in 1894
Railway stations served by ScotRail
Railway stations served by Caledonian Sleeper
James Miller railway stations
Listed railway stations in Scotland
Category B listed buildings in Perth and Kinross